The Fast and the Furious is a 2006 racing game developed by Eutechnyx and published by Namco Bandai Games for the PlayStation 2 and PlayStation Portable. The game is based on the Fast & Furious film series, particularly the third film The Fast and the Furious: Tokyo Drift.

Gameplay 
Players race on the Shuto Expressway (Wangan) or mountain roads (Touge). On the expressway, players can compete in point-to-point races or contests to achieve the highest speed between the start and finish. The mountain roads also have point-to-point races but also have competitions for the most drift. Hotspots are positioned along the roads to access race starts and car dealerships. There are eight different dealerships where vehicles can be purchased: Nissan dealership, Mitsubishi dealership, Mazda dealership, Honda dealership, Toyota dealership, Subaru dealership, Lexus dealership, and a U.S. Naval Base – where according to the instruction booklet included with the game, cars are brought over by stationed soldiers who end up selling them or are just imported. The tune shops are spread over the map and offer performance upgrades, visual upgrades, and paint jobs which are free and fully customizable by the player. The game includes many Japanese cars such as the Mazda RX-7, Mitsubishi Lancer Evolution, Subaru Impreza WRX STI, Toyota Supra, Honda NSX and the Nissan Skyline. However, Honda and Acura vehicles were not featured in the PAL version, due to licensing issues. There are also some American cars such as the Chevrolet Corvette Z06 and the Shelby GT500.

Development 
In 2003, Universal Interactive announced a Fast and the Furious game was in development by Genki, and showed off a demo of the game at that year's E3 expo. The promotional trailer is included as one of the bonus features in the 2 Fast 2 Furious DVD. However, that game was cancelled when Universal Interactive was shut down as a separate publisher the following year after ties between parent company Vivendi Games and Universal Studios were severed.

The published game is was a wholly separate development, begun under license from the film studio. It is considered a spiritual successor to 2004's Street Racing Syndicate, which was also developed by Eutechnyx and published by Namco, and with which it shares many themes and gameplay elements.

Reception 

The game was met with mixed reception. GameRankings and Metacritic gave it a score of 58% and 59 out of 100 for the PlayStation 2 version and 55% and 58 out of 100 for the PSP version.

Notes

References

External links 

2006 video games
Japan in non-Japanese culture
Eutechnyx games
PlayStation 2 games
Cancelled Xbox games
PlayStation Portable games
Bandai Namco games
Fast & Furious video games
Street racing video games
Video games developed in the United Kingdom
Video games scored by Tom Salta
Multiplayer and single-player video games
Video games set in Tokyo